Battle of the Bone is a 2008 Northern Irish independent zombie film written and directed by George Clarke, and is claimed as Northern Ireland's "first ever" kung-fu zombie movie.

Plot 
As rival mobs battle it out on the streets of Belfast, three friends are caught in the middle and have to contend not only with the rioters but a horde of marauding zombies.

Partial cast

Production 
Both the film's title and its plot timeline being set on 12 July, stem from King William III's 12 July 1690 Battle of the Boyne.  Created on a budget of £10,000, the filmmaker chose The Troubles as the film's inspiration and stated that he saw the movie as a means to address the issue of division with a twist that shows the two sides of the Belfast community joining to deal with a common threat. Filming took place in Belfast, Ireland at locations such as the Downshire psychiatric hospital. Per the Irish Times, the movie was "one of the biggest low-budget features to have been made in the city" and employed over 500 extras. Clarke and crew utilized various means to keep the film under budget, such as using a wheelchair as a makeshift dolly-rig and a cherry picker for aerial shots.

Release 
The film first screened in Belfast, on 17 July 2008, and was followed by a DVD release on 23 October 2008.

Reception 

Peter Dendle covered the film in the second volume of The Zombie Movie Encyclopedia, noting that it was "too low budget to come across to most general audiences as much more than friends having fun around some local buildings and streets, but George Clarke's impassioned zombie pic gained immediate attention both for some vivaciously choreographed action sequences and for its political overtones."

The director later noted that the film did not go over well with mainstream critics but that it appealed to the genre fans that viewed it.

Awards 

 Audience Choice Award at the Freak Show Horror Film Festival (2008, won)

References

External links 
 

2008 films
Northern Irish films
Films set in Belfast
2008 horror films
Martial arts horror films
British horror films
British independent films
British zombie films
2008 independent films
Films shot in Belfast
2000s English-language films
2000s British films